The Downtown Community School was an American experimental, cooperative, racially integrated school located on 235 East 11th Street in the Manhattan borough of New York City, New York. The school was founded in 1944 and closed in 1971.

Notable school reformer and folklorist, Norman Studer, was the director from 1950 to 1970. Prominent alumni of the school include Richard Kostelanetz. Parents who sent their children to the school included Leonard Boudin, Douglas Turner Ward, Josh White, Dore Ashton. and  Margaret Mead. 

In the early 1950s, the school employed a music teacher who had been blacklisted because of his refusal to cooperate with the House Un-American Activities Committee.  Unable to get concerts because of the blacklist, Pete Seeger was hired to teach singing. The school had links to other progressive private schools such as Little Red School House. 

In 1963, the school arranged to teach a group of African-American students who were protesting their assignment to a racially segregated school.

The school closed under financial pressure in 1971, after facing the prospect of raising tuition to cover increased mortgage costs.

References

1944 establishments in New York City
1971 disestablishments in New York (state)
Educational institutions disestablished in 1971
Educational institutions established in 1944
Experimental schools
Greenwich Village
Private schools in Manhattan